Caribbean Gold is a 1952 American pirate film directed by Edward Ludwig and starring John Payne, Arlene Dahl and Cedric Hardwicke.

It is known by the alternative title Caribbean.

Plot
In 1728, Dick Lindsay is taken prisoner by Captain Barclay and incarcerated aboard the Black Panther, his pirate ship. Also on board against his will is Robert MacAllister, nephew of Barclay's nemesis, Andrew MacAllister.

The pirate kidnapped Robert as retribution for MacAllister having long ago done likewise to Barclay's infant daughter, Christine. The feud has continued for more than 20 years. Now the pirate intends to settle it once and for all. He propositions Dick to impersonate Robert and return to his uncle, going so far as to duplicate a distinctive scar on Robert's face.

Dick does as told, hoping to gain his freedom. He is a welcome sight to MacAllister, but others are not quite sure what to make of this newcomer, including Shively, a brutal overseer of the men, and particularly Christine, now a grown woman with a volatile disposition.

Put in charge of the mill, Dick gains the trust of MacAllister's slaves, who are plotting a revolt. The real Robert's dead body washes up, however, so MacAllister now knows he is being deceived. Christine's growing love for Dick is a factor in not having him killed at first, but soon Shively and Dick are engaged in a knife fight to the death.

Captain Barclay and his men await a signal to invade the island. When a stash of explosives is detonated, they storm the isle. MacAllister is killed by Barclay, who is savoring his revenge when Christine gains some of her own, mortally wounding Barclay. She remains unaware that she has just killed her own father, and with his dying words, Barclay implores Dick to keep it a secret.

Cast
 John Payne – Dick Lindsay / Robert MacAllister 
 Arlene Dahl – Christine Barclay MacAllister 
 Cedric Hardwicke – Captain Francis Barclay 
 Francis L. Sullivan – Andrew MacAllister 
 Willard Parker – Shively 
 Dennis Hoey – Burford 
 Clarence Muse – Quashy 
 William Pullen – Robert MacAllister
 Walter Reed – Evans
 Ramsay Hill – Townsend 
 John Hart – Stuart 
 Zora Donahoo – Elizabeth 
 Woody Strode – Esau
 Ezeret Anderson – Cudjo 
 Kermit Pruitt – Quarino 
 Dan Ferniel – Caesar 
 Rosalind Hayes – Sally

Production
The film was based on a 1926 novel by Ellery Clark, Carib Gold.

In January 1951 the film rights were bought by Pine Thomas Productions, who had a deal to make films for Paramount. Mark Stevens was to star and Edward Ludwig to direct. However, by March, Stevens was out and the film was to star John Payne, who had made a number of movies for Pine Thomas. Curtis Kenyon and Morton Grant were to write the script.

In June 1951 John Payne signed a contract with Pine Thomas Productions to make two films a year for three years. The first of them were to be The Green Grass of Nevada and Caribbean Gold. In July Arlene Dahl was announced as Payne's co star; it would be the first under a deal for her to make two films a year for Pine Thomas over three years.

Filming was to begin October 1951 but Paramout had a backlog of unreleased films and asked Pine Thomas to push the shooting date back to January.

"It's strictly entertainment", Payne said of the film, adding that Hardwicke and Sullivan were "two of the finest actors in the business."

Dahl signed a nine-picture contract with Pine-Thomas.

Reception
It earned an estimated $1.4 million at the US box office in 1952.

Pine Thomas announced they would reteam Payne and Dahl in Lost Treasure of the Andes, Thunderbolt and High Tension. In the final event they did not appear together again. Neither was a remake of Old Ironsides, which Pine Thomas said they would make with Payne and Hardwicke.

References

External links

Review of film at Variety

1952 films
Pirate films
1950s English-language films
Films directed by Edward Ludwig
1950s action adventure films
Films set in the Caribbean
Films set in the 1720s
American action adventure films
American historical films
1950s historical films
1950s American films